Sharice Lynnette Davids (born May 22, 1980) is an American attorney, former mixed martial artist, and politician serving as the U.S. representative from  since 2019. A member of the Democratic Party, she represents a district that includes most of the Kansas side of the Kansas City metropolitan area, including Kansas City, Overland Park, Prairie Village, Leawood, Lenexa, and Olathe.

Elected in 2018, Davids became the first Democrat elected to represent a Kansas congressional district in a decade. She is the first openly LGBT Native American elected to the U.S. Congress, the first openly lesbian person elected to the U.S. Congress from Kansas, and one of the first two Native American women elected to Congress, along with Deb Haaland of New Mexico. She defeated incumbent Kevin Yoder in the 2018 election. She is also the second Native American to represent Kansas in Congress, after Charles Curtis, who was Herbert Hoover's vice president. As of 2022, Davids remains the only Democrat in Kansas's congressional delegation.

An attorney educated at the University of Missouri–Kansas City and Cornell Law School, Davids was a professional mixed martial artist in the 2010s.

Early life and education 
Davids was born on May 22, 1980, in Frankfurt, West Germany. She is a member of the Ho-Chunk people, and an enrolled member of the Ho-Chunk Nation of Wisconsin.

Her maternal grandfather, Fredrick J. Davids, a United States Army veteran, was born into the Mohican Nation Stockbridge-Munsee Band, in Oneida, Wisconsin. Sharice was raised by her single mother, Crystal Herriage, who served in the U.S. Army.

Davids attended Leavenworth High School, Haskell Indian Nations University, Johnson County Community College, the University of Kansas, and the University of Missouri–Kansas City, graduating from the latter with a bachelor's degree in business administration in 2007. She earned her Juris Doctor from Cornell Law School in 2010. She lives in Roeland Park, Kansas.

Mixed martial arts career 
Davids began competing in mixed martial arts (MMA) as an amateur in 2006, and went professional in 2013. She had a 5–1 win–loss record as an amateur and a 1–1 record as a professional. She tried out for The Ultimate Fighter but did not make it onto the show, leading her to shift her focus away from MMA to travel the U.S. and live on Native American reservations to work with the communities on economic and community development programs.

Record 
Professional

|-
| Loss
| align=center| 1–1
| Rosa Acevedo
| Decision (unanimous)
| LCS 18
| 
| align=center| 3
| align=center| 5:00
| Torrington, Wyoming, United States
|

|-
| Win
| align=center| 1–0
| Nadia Nixon
| Submission (triangle choke)
| Shamrock FC – Conquest
| 
| align=center| 1
| align=center| 2:08
| Kansas City, Missouri, United States
| 

Amateur

|-
| Win
|align=center| 5–1
| Heather Rafferty
| Decision (unanimous)
| Pride & Pain MMA
| 
|align=center| 3
|align=center| 3:00
| Hot Springs, South Dakota, United States
|
|-
| Win
|align=center| 4–1
| Chandra Engel
| Submission (triangle choke)
| Ultimate Blue Corner Battles
| 
|align=center| 1
|align=center| 2:36
| North Kansas City, Missouri, United States
|
|-
| Win
|align=center| 3–1
| Ronni Nanney
| TKO (knee & punch)
| Ultimate Blue Corner Battles
| 
|align=center| 3
|align=center| 3:00
| North Kansas City, Missouri, United States
|
|-
| Win
|align=center| 2–1
| Stacia Hoss
| TKO (knee & punch)
| Ultimate Blue Corner Battles
| 
|align=center| 1
|align=center| 0:27
| North Kansas City, Missouri, United States
|
|-
| Loss
|align=center| 1–1
| Erin Roper
| Submission (armbar)
| Shamrock FC: Midwest Fightfest
| 
|align=center| 1
|align=center| 1:53
| Kansas City, Missouri, United States
|
|-
| Win
|align=center| 1–0
| Courtney Martel
| Technical Submission (triangle choke)
| ISFC Midwest Fightfest
| 
|align=center| 1
|align=center| 0:44
| Kansas City, Missouri, United States
|

Legal career 
Davids began her legal career at SNR Denton in 2010. She later directed community and economic development for the Pine Ridge Indian Reservation.

In 2016, Davids worked as a White House Fellow in the Department of Transportation during the transition between the Obama and Trump administrations.

U.S. House of Representatives

Elections

2018 

In 2018, Davids ran for the United States House of Representatives in Kansas's 3rd congressional district. In the August Democratic primary election, she defeated Brent Welder, who had been endorsed by Bernie Sanders, 37% to 34%.

During a July 2018 episode of the Millennial Politics Podcast, host Jordan Valerie Allen asked Davids whether she supported abolishing ICE, the agency that enforces immigration laws and falls within the oversight of the Department of Homeland Security, to which Davids responded, "you asked me about defunding, which I think is probably essentially the same thing. But yeah." Despite denials by Davids through campaign statements and a television advertisement, the Associated Press fact checker ruled that she did in fact lend her support to ending the agency.

Kansas City NPR member station KCUR fact-checked the claims that incumbent Representative Kevin Yoder and Davids made in separate interviews on its station, and gave Yoder an "F". Yoder said that immigrants were making false asylum claims and would increase crime. Davids said that she supported single-payer health care, but it could not be enacted with Republicans in the White House. Meanwhile, she supports short-term goals like allowing Medicare to negotiate drug prices and getting generics to market faster. KCUR said that Davids's claim that teachers are not paid enough, and can no longer take tax deductions for buying their own school supplies, was "partly true and partly false" since the tax deduction had been reinstated.

Davids defeated Yoder in the November 8 general election. Upon her swearing-in on January 3, 2019, she became the first Democrat to represent Kansas in the House since Dennis Moore left office in 2011. She is also only the second Democrat to represent what is now the 3rd since 1963.

Davids and Deb Haaland of New Mexico, a Laguna Pueblo, are the first Native American women to serve in Congress.

2020 

In 2020, Davids was unopposed in the Democratic primary, winning 74,437 votes.

Davids faced the Republican nominee, Cerner Corporation executive and former Kansas Republican Party chairwoman Amanda Adkins, in the general election. Davids was endorsed by the Kansas City Star.

Davids defeated Adkins with 53.6% of the vote to Adkins's 43.6%.

2022 

In 2022, Davids ran for reelection in the newly drawn 3rd district. Redistricting made the 3rd somewhat more Republican; it  lost most of Kansas City while picking up some exurban territory to the west. Despite this, Davids defeated Amanda Adkins for the second time with 54.9% of the vote to Adkins's 42.8% and 2.3% for the Libertarian Steve Hohe. Her margin was almost identical to her 2020 margin.

Tenure
On December 18, 2019, Davids voted to impeach President Donald Trump and was the only person representing Kansas to do so. In March 2020, Davids quarantined herself for possible exposure to coronavirus. Before that, she had mostly switched her congressional office from physical to digital.

Davids was named a vice-chair of the 2020 Democratic National Convention.

As of November 2022, Davids had voted in line with Joe Biden's stated position 100% of the time.

Davids voted for the America COMPETES Act of 2022, which passed on a party-line vote. The bill authorized billions of dollars of government spending on American manufacturing and scientific research in an effort to compete with China. Davids added an amendment to the legislation that would include small and medium-sized manufacturers in a $500 million pilot program for producing personal protective equipment and medical supplies.

Committee assignments
Committee on Small Business 
Subcommittee on Economic Growth, Tax and Capital Access 
Committee on Transportation and Infrastructure 
Subcommittee on Aviation
Subcommittee on Economic Development, Public Buildings and Emergency Management
Committee on Agriculture
Subcommittee on General Farm Commodities, Risk Management and Credit
Subcommittee on Conservation, Research and Biotechnology

Leadership
Chief Deputy Whip

Caucus memberships 
 Congressional LGBT Equality Caucus (Co-chair)
 Congressional Native American Caucus (Vice Chair)
New Democrat Coalition (Vice Chair for 118th Congress)
 House Pro-Choice Caucus

Recognition
In 2019, Representative Cheri Bustos, then chair of the Democratic Congressional Campaign Committee, took note of Davids, "rating her toward the top of the freshman class in terms of doing things the right way."

In June 2019, to mark the 50th anniversary of the Stonewall riots, an event widely considered a watershed moment in the modern LGBTQ rights movement, Queerty named Davids one of the Pride50 "trailblazing individuals who actively ensure society remains moving towards equality, acceptance and dignity for all queer people". She was also named to the 2021 Fast Company Queer 50 list.

Personal life
Davids is among the few U.S. representatives not to identify with any religion.

Electoral history

See also 

 United States congressional delegations from Kansas
 List of LGBT members of the United States Congress
 List of Native Americans in the United States Congress
 Women in the United States House of Representatives
 2020 Kansas elections

References

External links 

 Congresswoman Sharice Davids official U.S. House website
 Campaign website

 

|-

1980 births
21st-century American women politicians
21st-century American politicians
20th-century Native American women
20th-century Native Americans
21st-century Native American women
21st-century Native Americans
American female mixed martial artists
Cornell Law School alumni
Democratic Party members of the United States House of Representatives from Kansas
Female members of the United States House of Representatives
Ho-Chunk Nation of Wisconsin people
Kansas lawyers
Lesbian politicians
LGBT members of the United States Congress
LGBT mixed martial artists
LGBT Native Americans
LGBT people from Kansas
American LGBT sportspeople
Native American members of the United States Congress
Living people
Mixed martial artists from Kansas
Strawweight mixed martial artists
University of Missouri–Kansas City alumni
Lesbian sportswomen
American expatriates in Germany
Politicians from Frankfurt
Sportspeople from Frankfurt
American athlete-politicians